Arhiba FC, or simply Arhiba, is a Djiboutian football club located in Arhiba, Djibouti. It currently plays in the Djibouti Division 2.

History
In 2017, Arhiba made news for receiving 25 Celtic shirts donated by Moussa Dembele.

Stadium
Currently the team plays at the 10,000 capacity Stade du Ville.

References

External links
Soccerway

Football clubs in Djibouti